Demänovská Dolina is a village and municipality in Liptovský Mikuláš District in the Žilina Region of northern Slovakia. More precisely, it is situated in Demänovská valley, where Demänovská Cave of Liberty and Demänovská Ice Cave can be found.

History
The municipality was founded in 1964.

Geography
The municipality lies at an altitude of 1 118 metres and covers an area of 47.878 km2. It has a population of about 340 people.

References

External links

www.demanovskadolina.info

Ski areas and resorts in Slovakia
Villages and municipalities in Liptovský Mikuláš District